Ternyck Needle is a conspicuous nunatak,  high, standing  east of the head of Martel Inlet at the base of the small peninsula separating Admiralty and King George Bays, on King George Island in the South Shetland Islands. It was charted in December 1909 by the French Antarctic Expedition under J.B. Charcot, who presumably applied the name. It was first climbed in 1949 by Geoff Hattersley-Smith and Ken Pawson of the Falkland Islands Dependencies Survey.

References

Mountains of King George Island (South Shetland Islands)
Nunataks of the South Shetland Islands